Nicholas James Donnelly (born 17 May 1988) is a British filmmaker and music video producer. Donnelly first gained national exposure when directing/producing the music video Game Over Female Takeover, an independent release that featured many of the leading female urban artists in England on one video. These artists included Lady leshurr, Mz Bratt, Ruff Diamondz, Cherri Voncelle, and Amplify Dot  The video served as the official remix to the record "Game Over".

In 2011, Nick produced the two part music video ‘Bad Boys Remix', a collaboration with rap artist Swiss from the So Solid Crew.  Bad Boys Remix 1 featured Blak Twang, Klashnekoff, Akala (rapper) among others from the late 2000 UK hip-hop scene, while Bad Boys Remix 2 featured Charlie Sloth, Krept and Konan and others.

In October 2011, Nick teamed with Ruff Ryders Entertainment to produce the music video Love Through The Speakers for battle rapper Murda Mook - the first music video from his mixtape 401k that was hosted by DJ Khaled and featured appearances from Akon, Jadakiss and Lil' Kim.

Nick's first film God Save The Queen was released in December 2015 and featured Motown artist and Rock and Roll Hall of Fame inductee Martha Reeves, as well as British songwriter Carla Marie Williams who wrote the records Runnin' and Freedom for Beyoncé. In 2018 Spotify premiered a documentary, at their London headquarters, directed and filmed by Nick Donnelly that was about Carla's process making music for herself. The unreleased documentary featured scenes at Abbey Road Studios and with Lily Allen at her studios.

Jo Harman's music video The Reformation is directed by Nick, as is the Hannah Williams & The Affirmations video Late Nights & Heartbreak  that was sampled by Jay-Z on the title track to his Grammy-nominated record 4:44 (album). Nick worked again with Hannah Williams & The Affirmations for the title track to their 2019 album '50 Foot Woman'. The music video to 50 Foot Woman was premiered by El País and FIP (radio station)

In July 2019, Nick Donnelly's production company Urban Kingdom revealed '''Generation W a book which features 100 British women writing about living through 100 years since women began to receive the vote in the UK. Women writing for the book include Olympic champion Sally Gunnell, Carol M. Black, Averil Mansfield, Lily Cole, Susie Wolff and many more.

In November 2019 Nick Donnelly worked with UK rap artist Blue Meth and US Hip-hop artist Method Man from Wu-Tang Clan on the music video 'Winnebago'''. 
In February 2020 Nick Donnelly released the music video 'What Ya Tellin Me' with Blue Meth which premiered on Worldstar.

In August 2020 Urban Kingdom released Nick Donnelly's second feature documentary film 'Street Smart'. The documentary features exclusive clips from Wu-Tang Clan 20th Anniversary Tour in Manchester, Brixton and at Bestival, the first time in 10 years that all living members of the group had been together in the UK. The film also features unseen interviews of Nick's with Method Man, Ghostface Killah, Statik Selektah, Rodney P and more, as well as the first ever English language interview with Danish musician Liv Lykke, whose record 'Tiden Flyver' with Boom Clap Bachelors was sampled by Kendrick Lamar on his record Bitch, Don't Kill My Vibe

In September 2020 Nick Donnelly's Urban Kingdom launched 'Generation Worldwide'  which featured over 50 female led artists from over 20 countries performing musical performances during the global Coronavirus lockdowns in association with the 'Generation W book. Musicians performing for the Urban Kingdom exclusive festival include Karen Harding, Girli, Aubrey Logan, Kalben and more. Speaking to The Courier (Newcastle University newspaper) Nick Donnelly said 'The idea for Generation Worldwide was reactionary... It was one of these ideas so crazy it might just work, but so crazy you would never even dream of writing it down in plan... Knowing that the music industry was broken this year, and knowing that on average only 19% of performers at festivals are women, we took this opportunity to create a new experience.'

On Friday 23 July 2021 Nick Donnelly's platform Urban Kingdom reopened the Newcastle music venue The Cluny for the first time since the removal of lockdown restrictions in the UK. Artists performing were Abi Nyxx, Lizzie Esau and Georgia May. In August 2021, Nick Donnelly and Urban Kingdom put on the first live music show at Orange Yard in Soho, a venue that was formerly known as Borderline and had hosted shows for artists such as Oasis (band) Amy Winehouse and R.E.M. Artists performing at the event at Orange Yard included Nadia Javed of the British pop punk band The Tuts, Berklee College of Music graduate Olivia Swann, BRIT School graduate Saina, Chelsea Blues and Atlanta Mae.

In March 2022, Nick Donnelly produced the ten part series 'Gen Wednesday'  hosted by Ryn Dean. The first season featured guests such as Leona Naess, Jo Schornikow of Phosphorescent (band), Claribel Caraballo who was VP at BMG Rights Management for nine years, Brazilian songwriter Bibi, Namibian musician and doctor Lioness, Egyptian artist Fayrouz Karawya and others. 

In June 2022, Nick Donnelly and Urban Kingdom announced his fiction book 'Urban Legends' and the announcement of a new interview with Zuby exclusive to Urban Kingdom. 

Nick Donnelly's debut fiction book Urban Legends was released on Wednesday 6th July 2022, and entered at number 9 in the movie and television charts and number 27 across all horror books on Kobo Inc.   On the second week, Urban Legends rose to number 1 in the movie and television charts on Kobo and entered into the top 10 in horror.  

In August 2022, Nick Donnelly's Urban Kingdom released their second platform 'Generation W' which launched with exclusive videos with Charlie Morgan (wrestler) Stacey Copeland and more.   

In October 2022, Generation W launched their first magazine titled 'Wearth'. Issue One was released exclusive to the city of Liverpool and featured exclusive interviews with women such as Maggie O'Carroll, Lizzie Acker and Freya Cox from the television show The Great British Bake Off, Rain Castillo, a semi-finalist on the 2022 edition of the show The Voice UK, Ngunan Adamu a presenter for BBC Radio Merseyside and others. Issue One launched at The Zanzibar in Liverpool.    

Nick Donnelly has also filmed and produced exclusive video interviews with Lonnie Liston Smith, Freddie Gibbs and Suzi Quatro which appear on the site Urban Kingdom.

References

Videographers
Living people
1988 births